A collider is a type of particle accelerator.

Collider may also refer to:

 Collider (band), an electroclash punk rock band formed in New York City in 1997
 Collider (Cartel album), 2013
 Collider (Fur Patrol album), 2003
 Collider (Sam Roberts album), 2011
 Collider (film), a 2013 film
 Collider (statistics), a statistical variable
 Collider (website), film website

See also
 Collide (disambiguation)
 Collision (disambiguation)